Chrysalis is a 2011 Spanish drama film written and directed by Paula Ortiz.

Cast 
 Maribel Verdú as Inés
 Leticia Dolera as Violeta
 Luisa Gavasa as Luisa
 Roberto Álamo as Paco
 Fran Perea as Pedro
  as Guardián
 Carlos Álvarez-Nóvoa as Tío Fernando
 Álex Angulo as Médico
 Ramón Barea as Marín
 Luis Bermejo as Valentín

References

External links 

2011 films
2011 drama films
2010s Spanish-language films
Spanish drama films
2010s Spanish films